Victor Martin "Trik" Trikojus CBE, DSc, FAA (1902–1985) was an Australian professor of biochemistry.

References

Fellows of the Australian Academy of Science
1902 births
1985 deaths
Australian Commanders of the Order of the British Empire
Australian biochemists